The girls' 1,000 metres event at the 2010 Youth Olympic Games was held on 19–23 August 2010 in Bishan Stadium.

Schedule

Results

Heats

Finals

Final B

Final A

External links
 iaaf.org - Women's 1000m

Athletics at the 2010 Summer Youth Olympics